World Wide Opportunities on Organic Farms (WWOOF), or World Wide Organization of Organic Farms, is a network of national organizations that facilitate homestays on organic farms. There are WWOOF hosts in 210 countries around the world, but no central list or organization encompasses all WWOOF hosts. As there is no single international WWOOF membership, all recognized WWOOF country organizations strive to maintain similar standards,  and work together to promote the aims of WWOOF.

WWOOF provides volunteers (often called "WWOOFers" or "woofers") with experience in organic and ecologically sound growing methods to help the organic movement. They let volunteers experience life in a rural setting or in a different country. WWOOF volunteers generally do not receive money in exchange for services. The host provides food, lodging, and opportunities to learn, in exchange for assistance with farming or gardening activities.

The duration of the visit can range from a days to years. Workdays average five to six hours, and participants interact with WWOOFers from other countries. WWOOF farms include private gardens through smallholdings, allotments, and commercial farms. Farms become WWOOF hosts by enlisting with their national organization. In countries with no WWOOF organization, farms enlist with WWOOF Independents.

History

WWOOF originally stood for "Working Weekends On Organic Farms" and began in England in 1971. Sue Coppard, a woman working as a secretary in London, wanted to provide urban dwellers with access to the countryside, while supporting the organic movement. Her idea started with trial working weekends for four people at the biodynamic farm at Emerson College in Sussex. People soon started volunteering for longer periods than just weekends, so the name was changed to Willing Workers On Organic Farms. Eventually the word "work" caused problems with some countries' labor laws and immigration authorities, who tended to treat WWOOFers as migrant workers and oppose foreigners competing for local jobs. (Many WWOOFers enter countries on tourist visas, which is illegal in countries such as the United States.) Both in an attempt to circumvent this and also in recognition of WWOOFing's worldwide scope, the name was changed again in 2000 to World Wide Opportunities on Organic Farms. Some WWOOF groups (such as Australia) choose to retain the older name, however.

Volunteering
Volunteers choose what country they would like to visit and volunteer in, and then contact the relevant organization to arrange the dates and duration of their stay at selected farms. The duration of a volunteer's stay can range from days to months, but is typically one to two weeks. Volunteers can expect to work for 4–6 hours a day for a full day's worth of food as well as accommodation. Volunteers may be asked to assist with a variety of tasks, including but not limited to; sowing seed, making compost, gardening, planting, cutting wood, weeding, harvesting, packing, milking, feeding, fencing, making mud-bricks, winemaking, cheese making, and bread baking.

See also

 Agritourism
 Agroecology
 Ecotourism
 Forest farming
 Natural farming
 Permaculture
 Organic Farming
 Workaway

References

External links
 WWOOF -  The Federation of WWOOF Organisations (FOWO)
 WWOOF International - WWOOF International Ltd Association

Organic farming organizations
Organic gardening
Simple living
Hospitality services
Cultural exchange
Organizations established in 1971
Supraorganizations